The Londonderry and Lough Swilly Railway Company (The L&LSR, the Swilly) was an Irish public transport and freight company that operated in parts of County Londonderry and County Donegal between 1853 and 2014. Incorporated in June 1853, it once operated 99 miles of railways. It began the transition to bus and road freight services in 1929. It closed its last railway line in July 1953 but continued to operate bus services under the name Lough Swilly Bus Company until April 2014, becoming the oldest railway company established in the Victorian era to continue trading as a commercial concern into the 21st century. Following a High Court petition by HM Revenue and Customs, the company went into liquidation and operated its final bus services on 19 April 2014.

History
The railway was initially planned as the Derry and Lough Swilly Railway Company when an application for incorporation was filed in 1852, after spurning the construction of a canal network to connect the two inlets. The company opened its first line, a  link between Derry and Farland Point, on 31 December 1863. A branch line between Tooban Junction and Buncrana was added in 1864 and much of the Farland Point line was closed in 1866.

In 1883, the  narrow gauge Letterkenny Railway between Cuttymanhill and Letterkenny was opened and the L&LSR connected with it by reopening the Tooban Junction - Cuttymanhill section of its Farland Point line. The L&LSR worked the Letterkenny Railway, and in 1885 it converted its track from  gauge to  narrow gauge to enable through running. In 1887, ownership of the Letterkenny Railway passed to the Irish Board of Works, which continued the agreement by which the L&LSR operated the line.

Carndonagh was reached by an extension completed in 1901 and Burtonport by a one completed in 1903. Both lines were constructed as joint ventures with the UK Government, with ownership and liabilities shared between the two parties. During this period the company did not make a profit, and struggled to meet its debts.

Locomotives

Routes

Routes eventually included:

Foyle Road Station, Middle Quay and Graving Dock Stations to Pennyburn level crossing, all in Derry where the depot was. Then west into Inishowen to Galliagh Road, Harrity's Road (approximate site of border between NI and the Republic), Bridge End, Burnfoot and Tooban Junction. At Tooban Junction (as the name implies) the railway branched, north into Inishowen and south into County Donegal proper. Northwards it ran through Inch Road, Fahan, Buncrana, Ballymagan, Kinnego, Drumfries, Meendoran, Clonmany, Ballyliffin, Rashenny, Carndoagh Halt, and Carndonagh. Southwards it ran through Carrowen (near Farland Point), Newtowncunningham, Sallybrook, Manorcunningham, Pluck, Letterkenny, Oldtown, New Mills, Fox Hall, Churchill, Kilmacrenan, Barnes Halt, Creeslough, Dunfanaghy Road, Falcarragh, Cashelnagore, Gweedore, Crolly, Kincasslagh Road, Dungloe and terminating in Burtonport.

Owencarrow Viaduct disaster
A serious accident occurred on the night of 30 January 1925 at around 8 pm at the Owencarrow Viaduct, County Donegal. Winds of up to 120 mph derailed carriages of the train off the viaduct, causing it to partially collapse. The roof of a carriage was ripped off, throwing four people to their deaths. The four killed were Philip Boyle and his wife Sarah from Arranmore Island, Una Mulligan from Falcarragh and Neil Duggan from Meenbunowen, Creeslough. Five people were seriously injured. The remains of the viaduct can today be seen from the road (N56) which carries on from the Barnes Gap on the road to Creeslough.

Transfer to road operations

From 1929, the company began to acquire bus assets throughout Donegal. Further expansion followed rapidly. It entered profitability in the early 1930s as a result of these ventures. Acquisition of freight operations followed, and this led to a reduction of rail services and eventual closure of lines. The Carndonagh branch was closed in about 1935 and the Burtonport line closing entirely in 1940, with a section temporarily re-opening in 1941 to Gweedore, closing finally in 1947. The Buncrana section of the line lost its passenger service in 1948, with its freight service, and the remaining Letterkenny services all closing on 8 August 1953.

Following the cessation of all rail services, the company provided only road transport. It purchased second-hand vehicles from a number of operators, including Ulsterbus, and obtained vehicles on loan from CIÉ. The company operated passenger bus services, freight services, and holiday tour services, as well as providing school bus services for many schoolchildren in Donegal. However, it failed to be profitable throughout the 1970s, and was purchased from bankruptcy by Patrick Doherty, a Buncrana businessman, in 1981. The company maintained offices at the Foyle Street Bus Depot in Derry, and in Letterkenny Bus Depot in Donegal. It also had large garage areas in Derry and Letterkenny, where it kept its fleet of buses. The majority of its bus fleet, with the exception of those used for holiday touring, was more than 10 years old, mainly considering of 1994 registered Dennis Darts.

An attempt to withdraw bus services from Donegal in June 2003 met with resistance, because the services were seen as crucial not only to schools but also to the elderly and rural population of Donegal. The company finally went into liquidation and ceased operations in 2014.

Bus routes operated:
 Route 952 Letterkenny-Kerrykeel/Fanad
 Route 953 Letterkenny-Gweedore/Dungloe
 Route 954 Londonderry/Derry-Letterkenny
 Route 955 Londonderry/Derry-Carndonagh via Buncrana
 Londonderry/Derry-Culmore
 Route 956 Londonderry/Derry-Buncrana
 Route 957 Londonderry/Derry-Muff
 Route 957 Londonderry/Derry-Greencastle
 Route 959 Londonderry/Derry-Carndonagh

The end of rail operations
The last train to run on the line was the 2.15 pm from Letterkenny to Derry on 8 August 1953. It included 14 wagons of cattle and arrived 50 minutes late. Bob Turner was the driver with Paddy Clifford as fireman. The Derry Journal reported at the time "... the guard, Mr. Daniel McFeeley, or anyone else, did not call out 'Next Stop Derry'. Everyone knew that the next stop would be the last stop - the last ever."

Liquidation of company and end of bus operations
In March 2014, HM Revenue & Customs petitioned the High Court to wind up the company due to substantial debts owed to them and other creditors. The company subsequently went into liquidation and ceased trading on 18 April 2014 with the loss of 80 jobs, 60 in Donegal and a further 20 in Derry. The announcement caused shock and anger in local communities. Bus Éireann and Ulsterbus took over some of the routes, having ensured transportation after the 2014 Easter holidays for the 2,000 schoolchildren who previously depended upon Lough Swilly services. The last bus services operated on the evening of Saturday 19 April. Some of the routes have been maintained by other operators.

In the media
An episode of the Channel 4 short documentary series Small Railway Journeys was based on the L&LSR giving many first hand accounts of the railway, including the viaduct accident. It detailed alleged cross border contraband smuggling and some irregular payment methods using local produce. The railway apparently had a reputation of treating freight with greater priority than passengers, evidenced by the distance of some stations from their served populations, and the delays caused due to the shunting of goods trucks attached to the passenger trains. It detailed the difficulties of running a railway in such an impoverished and inaccessible part of the country, with the frequent use of peat to fuel the trains, and the practice of handing down valued jobs on the railway from father to son.

See also
 Worsley Works produce model kits of Londonderry and Lough Swilly Railway railway vehicles
 Lists of rail accidents
 List of wind-related railway accidents
 List of narrow-gauge railways in Ireland
 List of Irish railway accidents
 Termon
 Creeslough

Other narrow gauge railways in Ulster

 Ballycastle Railway
 Ballymena, Cushendall and Red Bay Railway
 Ballymena and Larne Railway
 Castlederg and Victoria Bridge Tramway
 Cavan and Leitrim Railway
 Clogher Valley Railway
 County Donegal Railways Joint Committee

Notes

Bibliography

External links
Official Website
February 2010 bus & coach fleet list (Irish Transport Trust)
All-time bus & coach fleet list (The Classic Irish Buses website)

Transport companies of the Republic of Ireland
Closed railways in Ireland
Closed railways in Northern Ireland
Transport in County Donegal
Transport in County Londonderry
3 ft gauge railways in Ireland
Irish gauge railways